George Oldham (20 April 1920 – 1993) was an English footballer who played in the Football League for Newport County and Stoke City.

Career
Oldham was born in Tintwistle, Derbyshire and played amateur football with Mottram Central before joining Stoke City in 1938. He played twice for Stoke in 1938–39 before his career was interrupted by World War II. After the war was over Oldham joined Newport County where he spent two seasons and later went on to play for Hitchin Town.

Career statistics
Source:

References

1920 births
1993 deaths
Footballers from Derbyshire
English footballers
Association football fullbacks
Stoke City F.C. players
Newport County A.F.C. players
Hitchin Town F.C. players
English Football League players